George Clarke (1793-1871) was an Anglican priest: most notably Archdeacon of Antigua from 1850 to 1871.

Clarke was educated at St Catharine's College, Cambridge. Previously the Rector of St George, Dominica,  he died on 16 May 1871; and his wife on 31 December 1878.

Notes

19th-century Anglican priests
Archdeacons of Antigua
Alumni of Exeter College, Oxford
1793 births
1871 deaths